The 2019 season was FC Bunyodkor's 13th season in the Uzbek League in Uzbekistan.

Squad

Transfers

Winter

In:

Out:

Summer

In:

Out:

Friendlies

Competitions

Uzbek League

League table

Results summary

Results by round

Results

Uzbek Cup

League Cup

Group stage

Results

Squad statistics

Appearances and goals

|-
|colspan="14"|Players away on loan:

|-
|colspan="14"|Players who left Bunyodkor during the season:

|}

Goal scorers

Disciplinary Record

References

Sport in Tashkent
FC Bunyodkor seasons
Bunyodkor